The 1998 State of the Union Address was given by the 42nd president of the United States, Bill Clinton, on January 27, 1998, at 9:00 p.m. EST, in the chamber of the United States House of Representatives to the 105th United States Congress. It was Clinton's fifth State of the Union Address and his sixth speech to a joint session of the United States Congress. Presiding over this joint session was the House speaker, Newt Gingrich, accompanied by Al Gore, the vice president, in his capacity as the president of the Senate.

President Clinton discussed the federal budget, taxes and focused on the budget deficit, then at $10 billion. The president also discussed education, foreign relations, science funding, development, space travel and the Internet.

In the speech, the president acknowledged the deaths of Representatives Walter Capps and Sonny Bono.

The speech lasted 1:16:43 and consisted of 7,303 words.

The Republican Party response was delivered by Senator Trent Lott of Mississippi.

William Daley, the Secretary of Commerce, served as the designated survivor.

See also
United States House of Representatives elections, 1998

References

External links

(full transcript), The American Presidency Project, UC Santa Barbara
Coverage by the NewsHour with Jim Lehrer
Entire 1998 State of the Union address (video) at C-SPAN
Entire 1998 State of the Union Response (video) at C-SPAN
Entire 1998 State of the Union Response (transcript)
(full video and audio), Miller Center of Public Affairs, University of Virginia.

State of the Union Address 1998
State of the Union Address
State of the Union Address
State of the Union Address
State of the Union Address
Articles containing video clips
State of the Union Address
Presidency of Bill Clinton
State of the Union Address 1998
1998